In Greek mythology, Galatea (Ancient Greek: Γαλάτεια; "she who is milk-white") was the name of the following figures:

 Galatea, a Nereid who loved the shepherd Acis.
 Galatea, the statue of a woman created by Pygmalion and brought to life by Aphrodite.
 Galatea, daughter of Eurytius, son of Sparton. Her husband Lamprus wished to have a son and told her to expose the child if it turned out to be a girl. So when Galatea gave birth to a girl she asked the gods to change her sex, and Leto turned her into a boy (Leucippus)

Notes

References 

 Antoninus Liberalis, The Metamorphoses of Antoninus Liberalis translated by Francis Celoria (Routledge 1992). Online version at the Topos Text Project.
 Hesiod, Theogony from The Homeric Hymns and Homerica with an English Translation by Hugh G. Evelyn-White, Cambridge, MA.,Harvard University Press; London, William Heinemann Ltd. 1914. Online version at the Perseus Digital Library. Greek text available from the same website.
 Homer, The Iliad with an English Translation by A.T. Murray, Ph.D. in two volumes. Cambridge, MA., Harvard University Press; London, William Heinemann, Ltd. 1924. . Online version at the Perseus Digital Library.
 Homer, Homeri Opera in five volumes. Oxford, Oxford University Press. 1920. . Greek text available at the Perseus Digital Library.
 Publius Ovidius Naso, Metamorphoses translated by Brookes More (1859-1942). Boston, Cornhill Publishing Co. 1922. Online version at the Perseus Digital Library.
 Publius Ovidius Naso, Metamorphoses. Hugo Magnus. Gotha (Germany). Friedr. Andr. Perthes. 1892. Latin text available at the Perseus Digital Library.

Women in Greek mythology
Cretan characters in Greek mythology